is Misia's 8th and last single with Arista Japan. It was released on 1 January 2001 under the name of "Misia+DCT". It peaked at #3 selling 224,740 copies on its first week. The song is a duet between Misia and Dreams Come True vocalist, Miwa Yoshida. Misia penned the lyrics and composed the melody alongside DCT band member, Masato Nakamura.

Track list

Charts

External links
https://web.archive.org/web/20061117164950/http://www.rhythmedia.co.jp/misia/disc/ — Misia discography

2001 singles
Misia songs
Male–female vocal duets
Songs written by Misia
2001 songs
Songs written by Masato Nakamura